The Peninsula Building is a commercial high-rise building in Manchester, England. The building is part of Manchester's Green Quarter, a regeneration project north-west of Manchester city centre.

Background
Peninsula lies on the fringe of the city centre, opposite the Manchester Arena and Manchester Victoria station. Construction of the building began in 2007 and it opened in 2009. The Peninsula has a distinctive elliptical plan, and is clad in a glass and granite rainscreen. The building has a BREEAM rating of 'very good' and has on-site parking for up to 200 cars.

The Peninsula is a commercial building, and is head office for Peninsula Business Services, who occupy the first six floors. CDW occupy the eighth floor,  HRonline occupy the ninth floor (known as Cloud 9) and LateRooms.com occupy the top floors, employing 300 people at the building.

See also
NOMA, Manchester - a similar redevelopment scheme to the Green Quarter, adjacent to The Peninsula

References

External links
The Peninsula Manchester - official website
The Peninsula brochure

Buildings and structures in Manchester